The 2012 Portland Timbers season was the 2nd season for the Portland Timbers in Major League Soccer (MLS), the top flight professional soccer league in the United States and Canada. The season ended with a 1–1 tie with San Jose on October 27, an MLS record of 8-10-16, and elimination from the MLS Cup at 8th place in the western conference and 17th in the overall MLS regular season standings. The Timbers won the 2012 Cascadia Cup with a record of 3-1-2 against Seattle and Vancouver. Including all previous teams in the area to bear the "Timbers" name, this is the 26th season in the history of the Portland Timbers franchise.

Background

On July 9, Portland Timbers parted company with John Spencer. Gavin Wilkinson was then appointed as manager until the end of the season.

Preseason

California training camp

Return to Portland

Portland Timbers Tournament

Regular season

Competitions

Major League Soccer

Western Conference standings

Overall standings

Results summary

Results by round

U.S. Open Cup

Cup bracket

Third round

Cascadia Cup

The Cascadia Cup is a trophy that was created in 2004 by supporters of the Portland Timbers, Seattle Sounders FC and Vancouver Whitecaps FC. It is awarded to the club with the best record in league games versus the other participants.

2012 Reserve League

Club

Kits

Executive staff

Coaching staff

Squad

Current roster

Statistics

Appearances and goals
All players contracted to the club during the season included.

|-
|colspan="14"|Players who appeared for Portland no longer at the club:

Top scorers
Players with 1 goal or more included only.

Disciplinary record 
Players with 1 card or more included only.

Goalkeeper stats 
All goalkeepers included.

Last updated: March 18, 2012

Player movement

Transfers in

Loans in

Transfers out

Loans out

Unsigned draft picks

Miscellany

Allocation ranking 
Portland is in the #8 position in the MLS Allocation Ranking. The allocation ranking is the mechanism used to determine which MLS club has first priority to acquire a U.S. National Team player who signs with MLS after playing abroad, or a former MLS player who returns to the league after having gone to a club abroad for a transfer fee. A ranking can be traded, provided that part of the compensation received in return is another club's ranking.

International roster slots 
Portland has 8 MLS International Roster Slots for use in the 2012 season. Each club in Major League Soccer is allocated 8 international roster slots. Clubs may trade their excess international roster slots to other teams and there is no limit to the amount of slots each team can acquire.

Portland acquired one additional slot for use in the 2011 and 2012 seasons from Los Angeles Galaxy, in exchange for allocation money, to bring their total to 9 for their first two seasons in MLS. The Timbers then traded one of their 2012 slots to the Montreal Impact in exchange for not selecting any Timbers players in the 2011 MLS Expansion Draft and a 2015 MLS Supplemental Draft 4th Round pick.

Prior to the 2012 season, Portland acquired an additional slot from D.C. United for use in the 2012 and 2013 seasons in exchange for allocation money, bringing their total back up to 9 at the start of the 2012 season. In July 2012, Portland traded a slot to Colorado Rapids as part of the Kosuke Kimura deal. That slot returns to Portland after the 2012 season.

Future draft pick trades 
Future picks acquired:
 2013 MLS SuperDraft Round 1 pick from New York Red Bulls.
 2014 MLS SuperDraft Round 4 pick from Houston Dynamo.
 2014 MLS Supplemental Draft Round 1 pick from D.C. United.
 2015 MLS Supplemental Draft Round 4 pick from Montreal Impact.

Future picks traded:
 2013 MLS SuperDraft Round 1 pick to Houston Dynamo.
 2013 MLS SuperDraft Round 2 pick (conditional) to Montreal Impact. This pick may instead turn into use of an international roster slot for the 2013 season, dependent on the performance of Mike Fucito in 2012.

References

2012
American soccer clubs 2012 season
2012 Major League Soccer season
2012 in Portland, Oregon
Port